Fritsche is a German surname. Like Fritsch, Fritzsch and Fritzsche, it is a patronymic derived from Friedrich. Notable people with the surname include:

Claudia Fritsche (born 1952), Liechtenstein diplomat
Dan Fritsche (born 1985), American ice hockey player
Hans Fritsche (officer) (1909–1993), German Wehrmacht officer
Helmut Fritsche (1932–2008), German agronomist and politician
John Fritsche Jr. (born 1991), American ice hockey player
John Fritsche Sr. (born 1966), American ice hockey player
Colin Fritsche (born 2001), American ice hockey player

See also
Frič, Czechized variation of the name

Surnames from given names